Sphingopyxis italica is a bacterium. It is Gram-negative, aerobic, motile, rod-shaped and was isolated from volcanic rock in the Roman catacombs of Saint Callixtus in Rome. Its type strain is SC13E-S71T ( = DSM 25229T  = CECT 8016T).

References

External links 
LPSN
Type strain of Sphingopyxis italica at BacDive -  the Bacterial Diversity Metadatabase

Sphingomonadales
Bacteria described in 2013